Sakkhi Proman is a Bangladeshi film directed by Belal Ahmed.  Manna, Sathi, Sabrina and Amit Hasan are in lead roles.

Synopsis
The film's story is about an honest police officer and  lawyer who struggles hard to protect a witness from the criminals.

Cast
Manna
Sathi
Amit Hasan
Sabrina 
Wasimul Bari Rajib
Mizu Ahmed
Nasir Khan
Siraj Haider
Danny Raj
Syed Akhtar Ali 
Amjad Hossain
Morjina

Music
The film's songs have been both composed and penned by Ahmed Imtiaz Bulbul. 

"Amar Hater Chotpoti Aar Phuchka" - Baby Naznin
"Tumi Aar Ami" - Khalid Hasan Milu, Salma Jahan
"Churi Baaje Jhun Jhun Jhun" - Agun,  Jhumu Khan
"Tomar Omor Naam" (version 1) - Khalid Hasan Milu, Shakila Zafar
"Tomar Omor Naam" (version 2) - Khalid Hasan Milu, Shakila Zafar
"Keu Kande Keu Hase" (version 1) - Khalid Hasan Milu, Salma Jahan
"Keu Kande Keu Hase" (version 2) - Khalid Hasan Milu, Samina Chowdhury
"Amake Buke Niye Dekho" - Runa Laila
"Target, Tumi Je Target" - Runa Laila

References 

1989 films
1980s Bengali-language films
Films scored by Ahmed Imtiaz Bulbul